The Schelde-class tugboats are used by the Royal Netherlands Navy, primarily to move around large fenders and small sloops at the Nieuwe Haven Naval Base.

Ships in class

Replacement 
The five ships from the Schelde-class are set to be replaced by three new vessels which are going to be built by Stormer Marine in Hoorn. These new ships will be delivered in 2023 and 2024.

Notes

Citations

References 

Tugboats of the Royal Netherlands Navy